Phillip Roy Ball (October 19, 1925 – November 16, 2008) was an American football player and coach. He served as the head football coach at Central State College (and University)—now the University of Central Oklahoma—from 1964 to 1976, compiling a career college football record of 83–45–6, and one conference championship. He ranks 4th all-time for Broncho coaches in winning percentage, and 3rd number of games coached and victories.

Early life and education
Ball grew up in Yukon, Oklahoma, and graduated from Yukon High School in 1943. After high school Ball joined the United States Navy and enrolled in the University of South Carolina. While at South Carolina he was a guard on the football team. After graduating from South Carolina, Ball began coaching at several Oklahoma high schools including: Wewoka Walters, Seminole, and Muskogee.

Central State
Ball was hired as the head coach of Central State University in 1964 and coached the Central State Bronchos until 1976. During that span his teams went 83–45–6, including one conference championship, and one NAIA playoff appearance. Also at CSU he was known for compiling his own stats.

After coaching
Ball earned a Ph.D. from Oklahoma State University. He remained on the faculty at Central State/Central Oklahoma until his retirement in 1993. He died on November 16, 2008.

Head coaching record

Football

References

1925 births
2008 deaths
American football guards
Central Oklahoma Bronchos football coaches
South Carolina Gamecocks football players
High school football coaches in Oklahoma
Oklahoma State University alumni
University of Central Oklahoma faculty
People from Yukon, Oklahoma
Players of American football from Oklahoma
United States Navy personnel of World War II